Taaqatwar (English: Powerful) is a 1989 Indian Hindi-language action film directed by David Dhawan (in his directorial debut) and starring Sanjay Dutt, Govinda, Neelam Kothari and Anita Raj. It was a box office failure. Govinda worked with David Dhawan for the first time in Taaqatwar. He then formed a successful collaboration with David Dhawan and went on to act in 17 movies directed by him, most of which were comedy films and were successful. David Dhawan paired actor Sanjay Dutt and Govinda together for a further three successful films much later on in his career.

Cast
Sanjay Dutt as  Police Inspector Amar Sharma 
Govinda as  John D'Mello 
Anita Raj as Anju Khurana 
Neelam Kothari as John D' Mello's girlfriend
Paresh Rawal as  Ganguram Tulsiram  
Tanuja as Mrs. Sharma 
Anil Dhawan as  Master Peter D'Mello 
Anupam Kher as  Municipal Officer  Vijay Sharma 
Gulshan Grover as  Khurana's son 
Shakti Kapoor as  Munjal Khurana
Vikas Anand as Lawyer
Bhagwan as A Guest in wedding (Cameo Role) 
Gurbachan Singh as Sujit, Munjal Khurana Henchman

Soundtrack

External links 
 

1980s Hindi-language films
1989 films
1989 action films
Films directed by David Dhawan
Films scored by Anu Malik
Fictional portrayals of the Maharashtra Police
1989 directorial debut films
Indian action films
Hindi-language action films